The Leland Powers School, also known as the Leland Powers School of Communication, Leland Powers School of Radio, Theatre, and Television, Leland Powers Theatre School, the Leland Powers School of Expression, Leland Powers School of the Spoken Word, and originally called the Leland Powers School of Elocution, was originally located in the Fenway neighborhood of Boston, Massachusetts, and later in Brookline, Massachusetts. Speaker and author Leland Powers founded the school in 1904. The school educated several notable speakers and authors of the early 20th century, including drama educator T. Earl Pardoe, actress Reta Shaw, and journalist Wendall Woodbury.

History 
Leland T. Powers founded the school after teaching with the Redpath Lyceum Bureau, a Chautauqua circuit business. While working for the bureau, Powers was assigned as a reader during chautauquas, and as a coach to other readers. Powers also edited scripts for usage, focusing on readability and performance. During this time Powers was an associate of Carl Sandburg.

In 1904, Powers' school cost $200 for a semester's tuition. Joining his wife and more than a dozen staff members in teaching 140 students annually, Powers had a building constructed in 1914 at 31 Evans Way in the Fenway neighborhood next door to the Girls' Latin School.

The School was credited with being on the leading edge of technology when in 1944 it started broadcasting a show called "The Great American Home" on local station WIXG.

Graduates 
 Annette Carell, actress
 Fay Davis, actress
 Jeff Donnell, actress
 Mary Freeman Byrne, author
 Rod Fritz, newscaster, Boston (WBZ and WRKO) and New York (Fox) (as per this excerpt from the WRKO article)
 Ernest Holmes, religious leader
 Don Gillis, sportscaster
 Neil MacNevin (Tom Evans), radio/tv announcer (see Creature Double Feature)
 J T Nichols, playwright (Porktown, Taming the Savages, Jesus & the Pirates, etc.)
 Palmer Payne, newscaster, NYC (anecdote from his days at WCBS (880 AM))
 Glynn Ross, opera impresario
 Bob Wilson, sportscaster

References

External links 
 Powers, L. and Powers, C.H. (1911) Leland Powers School booklet.

Private universities and colleges in Massachusetts
Educational institutions established in 1904
Performing arts education in the United States
1904 establishments in Massachusetts